Nauplius, Nauplia or Nauplios , may refer to :

Greece-related
 Nauplius (mythology), in Greek mythology, the son of Poseidon and Amymone, the father of Palamedes, and also the name of an Argonaut
 Nauplia, a harbor town in Greece

Biology-related
 Nauplius (larva) of crustaceans
 Nauplius (plant), a genus in the family Asteraceae
 Nauplius, a copepod genus, considered synonymous with Cyclops
 Nauplius (journal), an academic journal covering carcinology

Other
 9712 Nauplius, an asteroid